State Highway 96 runs in Erode district and Tiruppur district of Tamil Nadu, India. It connects the towns of Erode and Kangeyam via Perundurai.

Route 
The highway passes through Perundurai and Chennimalai extending to a length of 51 km.

Major junctions 

 Intersects National Highway 381A near MGR Statue at Erode
 State Highway 173 near MGR Statue at Erode
 Erode Ring Road near Thindal, Erode
 National Highway NH-544 (Old NH-47) at Perundurai
 State Highway 83A at Kangeyam
 State Highway 172 at Kangeyam
 National Highway NH-81 (Old NH-67) at Kangeyam

References

State highways in Tamil Nadu
Transport in Erode